Christopher "Kip" Bateman (born October 9, 1957) is an American Republican Party politician, who served in the New Jersey Senate from 2008 to 2022, representing the 16th Legislative District. He previously served in the New Jersey General Assembly from 1994 to 2008, also in the 16th district.

Personal life
He was born in Somerville, New Jersey to Raymond Bateman, who represented the 16th district in the New Jersey Senate in the 1960s and 1970s, and was the Republican candidate for Governor of New Jersey in 1977, losing to incumbent Brendan Byrne. Bateman graduated from Somerville High School, and received a B.A. in 1980 from Ithaca College in Political Science and History and was awarded a J.D. in 1987 from the Seton Hall University School of Law. He lives in the Neshanic Station section of Branchburg Township, and is married with four children: Chris, Joe, Stephanie, and Katie.

Political career

Somerset County politics
Bateman served on the Branchburg Township Committee from 1983 to 1988 and was its Mayor in 1986. He then served on the Somerset County Board of Chosen Freeholders from 1988 to 1994 and was its Director in 1992. After being elected to the New Jersey General Assembly, Bateman was appointed to the Task Force to Study Homeowner Associations from 1996 to 1997 and the Delaware and Raritan Transportation Safety Study Commission from 1995 to 1996.

New Jersey State Assembly
Bateman served in the New Jersey General Assembly from 1994 to 2008, where he was the Assembly's Assistant Republican Leader from 2004 to 2005, was the Assistant Republican Whip from 2002 to 2003, the Majority Whip in 1996 and was the Assistant Majority Whip from 1994 to 1995. Bateman served in the Assembly on the Commerce and Economic Development Committee, the Financial Institutions and Insurance Committee and the Legislative Services Commission.

New Jersey State Senate
In the 2007 legislative elections, Bateman won the State Senate seat of retiring Senator Walter J. Kavanaugh. Prior to the 2011 redistricting, the 16th district consisted of most of Somerset County. Following the 2011 redistricting, towns in northern and eastern parts of Somerset (including Bridgewater) were removed, and were replaced by a portion of Hunterdon County, and the Democratic towns of South Brunswick and Princeton. This made the 16th district a swing district. He fended off a challenge by Democrat Maureen Vella by defeating her by 9 points in 2011. His 2013 election winning margin was larger as he defeated Christian Mastondrea by 20 points.

During the 2019 budget fight, Democrats defied Governor Phil Murphy and passed a budget without his proposed millionaire's tax. Bateman was one of six Republicans to vote for the budget.

On January 27, 2021, Bateman announced that he would be retiring and not run for re-election to the State Senate in 2021.

Bateman is a moderate Republican. He has been known to break with his party and vote with Democrats on environmental issues, as he is a believer in climate change. In addition, in each of his elections to the state legislature, Bateman received the endorsement of New Jersey environmental activist and New Jersey Sierra Club director Jeff Tittel, one of few Republicans that he has endorsed. Tittel and the Sierra Club awarded Bateman their Lifetime Achievement Award in 2012.

Committees
 Environment and Energy
 Judiciary

Electoral history

Senate

Assembly

References

External links
Senator Christoper 'Kip' Bateman's Official Site
Senator Bateman's legislative web page, New Jersey Legislature
New Jersey Legislature financial disclosure forms
2015 2014 2013 2012 2011 2010 2009 2008 2007 2006 2005 2004
Senator Christopher 'Kip' Bateman, Project Vote Smart

1957 births
Living people
Ithaca College alumni
Mayors of places in New Jersey
County commissioners in New Jersey
Republican Party New Jersey state senators
Republican Party members of the New Jersey General Assembly
People from Branchburg, New Jersey
Politicians from Somerville, New Jersey
Seton Hall University School of Law alumni
Somerville High School (New Jersey) alumni
21st-century American politicians